Hariono (born 2 October 1985) is an Indonesian professional footballer who plays as a defensive midfielder for Liga 1 club Bali United. He has made more than 200 official appearances in the highest level of Indonesian football.

Club career 
Hariono started his professional career at his hometown club Persida Sidoarjo in 2003. He left for another Sidoarjo club, Deltras F.C., in 2004, which at that time were playing in the Indonesian Premier Division.

Persib Bandung
In the 2008-09 season, he was brought to Persib Bandung by his former coach at Deltras, Jaya Hartono, who also moved from Deltras. He made his official Persib debut on 30 July 2008 in a match against Persela Lamongan, coming on for Suwita Patha in the second half. He was part of the squad that won the 2014 Indonesia Super League. He scored his first goal for Persib in a match against Perseru Serui in the 2016 Indonesia Soccer Championship A, although the competition was not officially recognised by FIFA as PSSI was being suspended at the time of the event. He eventually scored another goal in his farewell match for Persib on 22 December 2019 against PSM Makassar at 67th minute from a penalty kick, which would be his "official" competitive league goal for the club.

He has never received a straight red card at Persib, although he was sent off after being shown yellow cards twice; first on 11 October 2009 during a match against Persiba Balikpapan and on 5 February 2014 against Persita Tangerang. At the 2015 Indonesia President's Cup in the 2nd leg semi-final against Mitra Kukar, he kicked Carlos Sciucatti and was sent off. However, the decision was overturned and he was able to play in the final match against Sriwijaya F.C., which Persib won.

It was announced that Hariono would leave Persib in the end of 2019 season, having served for the club for 11 years. The club decided not to renew his contract and furthermore, coach Robert Alberts spoke to media that the squad needed regeneration, which would take Hariono's place in the squad. In his farewell speech, Hariono admitted that he was out of the coach's plan but he gave in to the decision and expressed his hopes to rejoin and eventually retire at the club.

Hariono will also have his squad number 24 retired temporarily (it would be brought out of retirement should he rejoin the club in the future) as confirmed by Persib Director Teddy Tjahyono.

Bali United
On 28 December 2019, Hariono signed for Bali United. Hariono made his debut for Bali United as a substitute for Brwa Nouri in a 5-3 win against Tampines Rovers in the 2020 AFC Champions League qualifying play-offs. This season was suspended on 27 March 2020 due to the COVID-19 pandemic and was abandoned and declared void on 20 January 2021.

Personal life
Hariono is mononymous and has no surname. Prior to his football career, he once worked as a porter at a local convenience store in Surabaya.

On 12 October 2014, Hariono married a policewoman, Fianita Kusuma Wati.

Career statistics

International goals

|}

Honours

Club
Persib Bandung
 Indonesia Super League: 2014
 Indonesia President's Cup: 2015

Bali United
 Liga 1: 2021–22

International
Indonesia
 Indonesian Independence Cup: 2008

References

External links
 
 

Indonesian footballers
1985 births
Living people
Javanese people
People from Sidoarjo Regency
Indonesia international footballers
Liga 1 (Indonesia) players
Deltras F.C. players
Persib Bandung players
Bali United F.C. players
Association football midfielders
Indonesian Super League-winning players
Sportspeople from East Java